Al-Qarn also known as Qarn Mikhled, is a village in the sub-governorate of Bariq in the 'Asir Province, Saudi Arabia. It is best known for being the birthplace of Uwais al-Qarni, naming comes from Qarn Makhlad - with the opening of the qaf and sukoon al-ra, which is the language of the small, isolated mountain - added to the mukhalled with the opening of its first and sukoon again, and the immortal for them are the remains of the remaining homes; It is said to have immortals for the length of its stay after the lessons of the ruins..

See also 

 List of cities and towns in Saudi Arabia
 Regions of Saudi Arabia

References 

Populated places in Bareq
Populated places in 'Asir Province
Populated coastal places in Saudi Arabia